The South Central Triple A Hockey League is a minor level ice hockey league based out of Ontario. The league is one of two AAA leagues associated with the Ontario Minor Hockey Association and has a total of 10 teams. The South Central Triple A League playoffs are played in tournament style. The top two teams advance to the OMHA Championships.

Teams

External links
SCTA website
OMHA website

3
Youth ice hockey leagues in Canada